Echitamidine is an indole alkaloid isolated from Alstonia boonei.  Its laboratory synthesis has been reported.

References

Indolizidines
Tryptamine alkaloids
Carbazoles